Scylace or Skylake, was a town of ancient Mysia, on the coast of the Propontis, east of Cyzicus. It was a Pelasgian town; in this place and the neighbouring Placia, the Pelasgians, according to Herodotus, had preserved their ancient language down to his time. The Periplus of Pseudo-Scylax mentions only Placia, but Pomponius Mela and Pliny the Elder speak of both as still existing. 

Its site is tentatively located near Yeni Köy, Bursa Province, Turkey.

References

Populated places in ancient Mysia
Former populated places in Turkey
Greek colonies in Mysia
History of Bursa Province